The occupation of the West Bank can refer to:

 The Jordanian annexation of the West Bank, 1948–1967
 The Israeli occupation of the West Bank, June 1967–present